The Festiniog Railway served a cluster of quarries around the town of Blaenau Ffestiniog in Wales. Most of these were slate quarries, although granite quarries and zinc mines were also connected by narrow gauge tramways to the railway.

Map

The quarries

Images

References

Bibliography

See also
 Conwy Valley Line
 British narrow gauge railways
 Slate industry in Wales
 Ffestiniog railway

Ffestiniog Railway
 
Ffestiniog Railway
Ffestiniog Railway
Ffestiniog Railway
Ffestiniog Railway

cy:Rheilffordd Ffestiniog
da:Ffestiniog Railway
de:Ffestiniog Railway